A total solar eclipse occurred on June 26, 1824. A solar eclipse occurs when the Moon passes between Earth and the Sun, thereby totally or partly obscuring the image of the Sun for a viewer on Earth. A total solar eclipse occurs when the Moon's apparent diameter is larger than the Sun's, blocking all direct sunlight, turning day into darkness. Totality occurs in a narrow path across Earth's surface, with the partial solar eclipse visible over a surrounding region thousands of kilometres wide.
Totality was visible across parts of China and Japan, with a partial eclipse across much of North America near sunset.

Related eclipses 
It is a part of solar Saros 124.

References

 NASA chart graphics
 Googlemap
 NASA Besselian elements

1824 6 26
1824 in science
1824 6 26
June 1824 events